Outlaws of Stampede Pass is a 1943 American Western film directed by Wallace Fox and written by Adele Buffington. This is the fourth film in the "Marshal Nevada Jack McKenzie" series, and stars Johnny Mack Brown as Jack McKenzie and Raymond Hatton as his sidekick Sandy Hopkins, with Ellen Hall, John Dawson, Harry Woods and Charles King. The film was released on October 15, 1943, by Monogram Pictures.

Plot
Tom Evans (Jon Dawson) has trail-driven his heard to Yucca City, where he intends to sell the heard to Ben Crowley (Harry Woods). Crowley is the town big shot who owns most everything of value in the town. The night before driving the cattle into town to make the final sale, Evans gets caught up in a crooked card game hosted by Crowley. During the game a U.S. Marshal, "Nevada Jack" McKensey (Johnny Mack Brown) who is working undercover, manages to obtain one of the fixed deck of cards. While Evans is engaged in the game Crowley takes his gang, rustles the cattle, and kills Evans' cowhands. When Evans learns his men have been shot, and his cattle stolen, he rushes out of the saloon, only to be shot in the back by one of Crowley's thugs. McKensey rescues Evans and shutters him with the local blacksmith Jeff Lewis (Sam Flint) and his daughters Mary. They send for U.S. Marshall Sandy Hopkins, Evans' uncle, and hatch a plan to make things right. Deception and gunfire ensue, and the good guys go for the win.

Cast          
Johnny Mack Brown as Nevada Jack McKenzie
Raymond Hatton as Sandy Hopkins
Ellen Hall as Mary Lewis
John Dawson as Tom Evans 
Harry Woods as Ben Crowley
Charles King as Steve Carse
Edmund Cobb as Hank
Sam Flint as Jeff Lewis 
Mauritz Hugo as Slick 
Art Mix as Gus
Herman Hack as Ed
Artie Ortego as Joe
Milburn Morante as Zeke
Edward Burns as Red 
Dan White as Kurt

References

External links

American Western (genre) films
1943 Western (genre) films
Monogram Pictures films
Films directed by Wallace Fox
American black-and-white films
Films based on works by Johnston McCulley
Revisionist Western (genre) films
1940s American films
1940s English-language films